Biscardi is an Italian surname. Notable people with this surname include:

 Aldo Biscardi (1930–2017), Italian football broadcaster, best known for presenting the show Il processo di Biscardi
 Chester Biscardi (born 1948; nicknamed Chet), Italian American composer and educator
 Luigi Biscardi (1928–2019), Italian politician
 Tom Biscardi (born 1948), cryptozoology enthusiast, Las Vegas promoter, internet radio host, and film producer

See also
 Il processo di Biscardi, Italian television program

Italian-language surnames